Ceratopetalum apetalum, the coachwood, scented satinwood or tarwood, is a medium-sized hardwood tree, straight-growing with smooth, fragrant, greyish bark. It is native to eastern Australia in the central and northern coastal rainforests of New South Wales and southern Queensland, where is often found on poorer quality soils in gullies and creeks and often occurs in almost pure stands. C. apetalum is one of 8 species of Ceratopetalum occurring in eastern Australia, New Guinea, New Britain and various islands in the same region.

Description
The stem has distinctive horizontal marks, or scars, which often encircle the trunk. Larger trees have short buttresses. The heartwood is attractive with a colour ranging from pale pink to pinkish-brown. The sapwood is not always distinguishable, the grain is straight, finely textured and even. On the tangential face the wood is often highly figured. The wood has a characteristic caramel odour.

Taxonomy
Ceratopetalum apetalum was first formally described in 1830 by David Don in the Edinburgh Philosophical Journal, from specimens collected by George Caley.

The common name of coachwood comes from its use in the building of coaches.

Uses
Its timber is light and easily worked. It is used for flooring, furniture and cabinetwork, interior fittings, turnery, gun stocks, wood carving, veneers as well as spars and masts for boats. Courtroom number three of The High Court of Australia is completely furnished with coachwood timber.

References

 Floyd, A.G., Rainforest Trees of Mainland South-eastern Australia, Inkata Press 1989, 

apetalum
Flora of Queensland
Flora of New South Wales
Oxalidales of Australia
Trees of Australia